Nachappa Gopalsami is an electrical engineer at the Argonne National Laboratory in Lemont, Illinois. He was named a Fellow of the Institute of Electrical and Electronics Engineers (IEEE) in 2015 for his contributions to millimeter-wave spectroscopy, imaging, and reflectometry.

References

Fellow Members of the IEEE
Living people
Year of birth missing (living people)
Place of birth missing (living people)
American electrical engineers